Slurry is a settlement in Ngaka Modiri Molema District Municipality in the North West province of South Africa.

Slurry is a village with a large cement factory, 22 km north-east of Mafikeng and 15 km south-west of Ottoshoop. It was named after the mixture of limestone and other components in the manufacture of cement.

References

Populated places in the Mafikeng Local Municipality